Sa'ar tribe also spelled Sai'ar tribe is a Yemeni Bedouin tribe. The tribe is located in central Yemen, mainly in al-Abr, Raydat as Say‘ar and Hagr As Sai'ar District. The members of the tribe are known as "the wolves of the desert". According to Wilfred Thesiger, the Sa'ar tribe was feared and hated by all South Arabian desert tribes.

Notable events 
In 2016, Hashim al-Ahmar, the brother of Sadiq al-Ahmar, the leader of Hashid tribe, guards killed two members of the Sa’ar tribe in al-Abr. The Sa’ar tribe prepared for a war against the tribe of Hashid. Ali Moshen al-Ahmar intervened to settle down the crisis between the two tribes but the tribe of Sa’ar refused his arbitration. Eventually the army of Hashim al-Ahmar left the area of al-Abr.

References 

Yemeni tribes